Apoecus is a genus of air-breathing land snails, terrestrial pulmonate gastropod mollusks in the subfamily Eninae of the family Enidae.

Species
Species within the genus Apoecus include:
 Apoecus abbreviata (Bavay & Dautzenberg, 1915)
 Apoecus albescens (Möllendorff, 1884)
 Apoecus apertus (E. von Martens, 1863)
 Apoecus chineensis (Bavay & Dautzenberg, 1909)
 Apoecus colonus (Möllendorff, 1895)
 Apoecus corti (Bavay & Dautzenberg, 1909)
 Apoecus glandula (Mousson, 1848)
 Apoecus granifer (Möllendorff, 1901)
 Apoecus granulatus (Möllendorff, 1884)
 Apoecus huberi (Thach, 2018)
 Apoecus leptostracus (Schmacker & O. Boettger, 1891)
 Apoecus macrostoma (Bavay & Dautzenberg, 1912)
 Apoecus messageri (Bavay & Dautzenberg, 1900)
 Apoecus montivagus (van Benthem Jutting, 1959)
 Apoecus phaedusoides (Thiele, 1931)
 Apoecus prillwitzi (Möllendorff, 1897)
 Apoecus ramelauensis Köhler, Criscione, Burghardt & Kessner, 2016
 Apoecus scaber (Bavay & Dautzenberg, 1912)
 Apoecus semmelinki (Maassen, 2002)
 Apoecus tenggericus (Möllendorff, 1897)
 Apoecus tenuiliratus (Möllendorff, 1897)
 Apoecus tenuistriata (Dautzenberg & H. Fischer, 1908)
 Apoecus thraustus (Möllendorff, 1897)
 Apoecus tonkinianus (Bavay & Dautzenberg, 1912)
 Apoecus trivialis (Ancey, 1888)
 Apoecus varians (Bavay & Dautzenberg, 1912)
 Apoecus warburgi (Schmacker & O. Boettger, 1891)
 Apoecus wilhelminae (Maassen, 1998)
Species brought into synonymy
 Apoecus clausiliaeformis (Bavay & Dautzenberg, 1912): synonym of Apoecus phaedusoides (Thiele, 1931) (replacement name)

References

External links

 Kobelt, W. (1899-1902). Die Familie Buliminidae. In: Systematisches Conchylien-Cabinet von Martini und Chemnitz, Ersten Bandes, dreizehnte Abtheilung, zweiter Theil
 Köhler F., Criscione F., Burghardt I. & Kessner V. (2016). The Enidae of Timor (Stylommatophora: Orthurethra). Molluscan Research. 37(1): 8-16

Enidae